Isobel Buchanan (born 15 March 1954) is a Scottish operatic soprano.

Early life and career
Isobel Buchanan was born in 1954 in Glasgow, Scotland. In 1971, aged 17, she received a scholarship to the Royal Scottish Academy of Music and Drama, where in 1974, she was awarded with Student of the Year prize. She also won the Governor's Recital Prize that same year.
 
She signed a three-year contract with The Australian Opera in 1975 to pursue her career in singing. The next year, she made her professional operatic debut as Pamina in the company's production of The Magic Flute.  She was the youngest Principal Artist in the company's history.

She made her debut in England in 1978 at Glyndebourne Festival Opera, again as Pamina in a new production by John Cox. (She returned to Glyndebourne in 1981 as Countess Almaviva in Mozart's The Marriage of Figaro and reprised the role at the 1984 has grown lot Festival.)

In 1978, she sang Micaela in Carmen at the Vienna State Opera, conducted by  Carlos Kleiber with Plácido Domingo as Don José and Elena Obraztsova as Carmen, in a production by Franco Zeffirelli. (She had sung Michaela in Sydney.) She continued adding to her repertoire with Sophie in Massenet's Werther and a Flower Maiden in Wagner's Parsifal at the Royal Opera House in 1979.

Since then, she has appeared at many other major opera houses and companies including the Lyric Opera of Chicago, Scottish Opera, the Metropolitan Opera, Bavarian State Opera, Opéra National de Paris, Hamburg State Opera, Opéra de Monte-Carlo, and the Cologne Opera. She has collaborated with many renowned conductors, including Georg Solti, Bernard Haitink, Andrew Davis, Colin Davis, Sergiu Celibidache, John Pritchard, Neville Marriner, Carlos Kleiber and Yehudi Menuhin.

The BBC made a documentary of her career in 1981. She featured in three-part series called Isobel which was recorded in August 1983 and aired on BBC the following April. In 1983 she played Diana in the BBC television production of Orpheus in the Underworld. and also appeared in TV programmes such as Face the Music and Parkinson.

In 1990, she sang at HM The Queen Mother's 90th Birthday celebration at the London Palladium in a section dedicated to Scotland. She sang "My Ain Folk" and appeared with Her Majesty's PM John Spoore and actress Geraldine McEwan with a reading of recollections of childhood in Glamis.

Family
She is married to the Australian-born English stage actor Jonathan Hyde. They have two daughters; one of them is a British actress, Georgia King.

Repertoire
Her repertory includes:

Recordings
 Bizet:  Carmen (Elena Obraztsova,  Plácido Domingo, Isobel Buchanan, Wiener Staatsoper orchestra and chorus, Carlos Kleiber)   DVD TDK  8 24121 00097 4
 Bellini: La sonnambula (Joan Sutherland, Luciano Pavarotti, Nicolai Ghiaurov, Isobel Buchanan, Della Jones, National Philharmonic Orchestra, London Opera Chorus, Richard Bonynge) CD Decca 2LH417-424
 Delibes: Lakmé (Joan Sutherland, Isobel Buchanan, Huguette Tourangeau, Henri Wilden, John Pringle, Elizabeth Sydney Orchestra, Australian Opera Chorus, Richard Bonynge) DVD Kultur Video 32031 00389
 Massenet: Werther (José Carreras, Frederica von Stade, Isobel Buchanan, Thomas Allen, Robert Lloyd, Orchestra of the Royal Opera House, Covent Garden, Colin Davis) CD Philips 00289 475 7567 
 Puccini: Suor Angelica (Joan Sutherland, Christa Ludwig, Anne Collins, Isobel Buchanan, National Philharmonic Orchestra, Richard Bonynge) CD Decca 458218

See also
 Massenet: Werther (Colin Davis recording)

References

External links
 
 Photograph of Buchanan rehearsing Cosi fan tutte in the Sydney opera house, 1976, National Library of Australia.
 Performances in opera houses, conductors Frome Festival, 2008.
 Interview with Isobel Buchanan by Bruce Duffie, 14 October 1981

Scottish operatic sopranos
Musicians from Glasgow
1954 births
Living people
21st-century Scottish women opera singers
20th-century Scottish women opera singers